Tudo que Eu Quero Dizer Tem que Ser no Ouvido (Portuguese for Everything I Want to Tell You Has to Be Whispered on Your Ear) is the debut solo studio album by Brazilian musician Cadão Volpato, famous for his work with post-punk band Fellini. It was released on April 4, 2005 via Brazilian independent label Outros Discos, and recorded in two sessions: one in the Estúdio Quadrophenia in September 2003 and the other at the Estudio del Bojo in September 2004.

According to the album's liner notes, the album is dedicated to Volpato's wife, Dani Bianchi.

Track listing

Reception
Laboratório Pop gave the album 3 out of 5 stars, praising Volpato's "interesting allusions to works of cinema, plastic arts and popular music", but criticized its "lack of texture" saying that "the CD is nothing but a sketch of good songs that would be better executed by Fellini".

Personnel
 Cadão Volpato — vocals, all instruments, cover art, production
 Maurício Bussab — production, mixing
 Paola Bianchi — art direction
 Dani Bianchi — photos
 Sandro Garcia — "cosmic guitar" (on track 10)

References

External links
 Cadão Volpato's official website
 Cadão Volpato at Deezer
 All tracks of the album available for listening 

2005 debut albums
Portuguese-language albums